XXXXVI Panzer Corps (46th) was a tank corps of the German Army during World War II that participated in the invasion of Yugoslavia.

The Corps was created as the XXXXVI Army Corps and converted to a Panzer Corps on 21 June 1942.

The Panzer Corps took part in Operation Barbarossa and fought in Kiev, Putyvl, Vyazma and Volokolamsk. It later fought in Rusa-Volokolamsk, Rzhev, Vyazma and Yelnya before taking part in Operation Zitadelle (Kursk). It retired to the Svin area in September 1943 and to Mozyr in December. 
It was transferred to the southern sector in January 1944 and fought at Vinnitsa and later on the Dniester. It withdrew to Poland and ended the war in Pomerania by surrendering to British forces, by which point it only had the 547th Volksgrenadier Division and the 2nd Naval Division under its command.

Commanders 
 20 June 1940 - 11 June 1942 : Heinrich von Vietinghoff
 11 June 1942 - 20 November 1942 : Hans Zorn
 20 November 1942 - 20 June 1943 : Hans-Karl Freiherr von Esebeck 
 20 June 1943 - 2 August 1943 : Hans Zorn 
 5 August 1943 - 21 March 1944 : Hans Gollnick 
 22 March 1944 - 3 July 1944 : Friedrich Schulz 
 3 July 1944 - 23 July 1944 : Fritz Becker 
 24 July 1944 - 28 August 1944 : Smilo Freiherr von Lüttwitz 
 29 August 1944 - 20 September 1944 : Maximilian Felzmann 
 21 September 1944 - 19 January 1945 : Walter Fries 
 19 January 1945 - 3 May 1945 : Martin Gareis

Notes

References

Literature 

 

Panzer corps of Germany in World War II
Military units and formations disestablished in 1945